"Coming Around Again" is the first single released from Blue band-member Simon Webbe's second solo studio album, Grace. The single was released on 30 October 2006, performing the song live on BBC One's reality-dancing series Strictly Come Dancing the following week. The song entered the charts at #50 based on digital sales only, and upon its physical release, climbed to a peak position of #12 on the UK Singles Chart. It also peaked at #7 on the Dutch Singles Chart, and at #37 on the German Top 100.

Track listing
 UK CD1
 "Coming Around Again" - 3:41
 "No Worries" (Breakdown Mix) - 3:17

 UK CD2
 "Coming Around Again" - 3:41
 "Whatever Gets You Through The Night" - 3:53
 "Rain" - 4:00
 "Coming Around Again" (Video) - 3:41

Charts

Weekly charts

Year-end charts

References

2006 singles
Simon Webbe songs
Songs written by Simon Webbe
Songs written by Matt Prime
Songs written by Tim Woodcock
2006 songs